Astley Cooper (1768–1841), was an English surgeon and anatomist.

Astley Cooper may also refer to:

Astley David Middleton Cooper (1856–1924), American painter
Sir Astley Paston Cooper, 2nd Baronet (1798–1866) of the Astley-Cooper baronets
Sir Astley Paston Paston-Cooper, 3rd Baronet (1824–1904) of the Astley-Cooper baronets

See also
Ashley Cooper (disambiguation)